Robinson Glacier is a channel glacier flowing to the Antarctic coast between Merritt Island and Reist Rocks. It was mapped in 1955 by G.D. Blodgett from air photos taken by U.S. Navy Operation Highjump (1946–47), and was named by the Advisory Committee on Antarctic Names (US-ACAN) for R.P. Robinson, Purser's Steward of the ship Vincennes on the United States Exploring Expedition under Lieutenant Charles Wilkes, 1838–42.

See also
 List of glaciers in the Antarctic
 Glaciology

References
 

Glaciers of Wilkes Land